HMS Romney was a 50-gun fourth rate ship of the line of the Royal Navy, built by Sir Joseph Allin to the 1706 Establishment at Deptford Dockyard, and launched on 2 December 1708.

On 11 June 1723 orders were issued for Romney to be taken to pieces and rebuilt at Deptford according to the 1719 Establishment, and she was relaunched on 17 October 1726.

Romney was sold out of the navy in 1757.

Notes

References

Lavery, Brian (2003) The Ship of the Line - Volume 1: The development of the battlefleet 1650-1850. Conway Maritime Press. .

Ships of the line of the Royal Navy
1700s ships